Espinho is a freguesia in Mangualde, Portugal. The population in 2011 was 984, in an area of 14.55 km2.

References

Freguesias of Mangualde